The Battle for Grain, also known as the Battle for Wheat, was a propaganda campaign launched in 1925 during the fascist regime of Italy by Benito Mussolini, with the aim of gaining self-sufficiency in wheat production and freeing Italy from the "slavery of foreign bread". This campaign was successful in increasing wheat output and lowering the trade balance deficit, but was ultimately economically counter-productive for Italy's agricultural sector as farmers who grew other produce had to clear their land for grain cultivation which decreased exports and thus resulted in higher food prices which placed Italian families under financial strain.

Aims
Here are some of the policy's aims:

 Boost grain production to make Italy self-sufficient in wheat
 Reduce the trade balance deficit
 Reduce the need of importing bread
 Project Italy as a major European power

Impact
In the year following the announcement of the Battle for Grain, wheat production levels stood at 50% higher than those in 1914 and this was because farmers were encouraged to ditch traditional farming methods in favour of purchasing modern equipment and adopting new techniques in order to increase efficiency and maximise wheat yields. However, this programme depended on farmers clearing their land for grain cultivation which many did, but this resulted in a sharp decline in Italy's chief exports such as wines, cheeses and fruits as well as meat and dairy products since there was limited agricultural space for viticulture and livestock rearing and other European rivals such as Spain and Greece subsequently took over and prospered from their trade. Consequently, there were food shortages which meant the price for these products soared and families were placed under considerable financial difficulty as each household had to pay an extra 400 lire per year in food costs. This meant Mussolini was forced into increasing imports to appease the discontented Italian population and these rose to over 500 million tonnes by 1933. Furthermore, to ensure wheat grew en masse, fertilisers were required which needed to be imported from elsewhere. Therefore, it is clear that the Battle for Grain was merely a propaganda initiative designed to project an image of a hard-working, ruralised Italian populace who were loyal fascists successfully fulfilling Mussolini's fanatical policies of Italy being a self-sufficient, autarkic state. In reality,  Italy lacked the necessary infrastructure and development to achieve this goal which was compounded by apathy from Italian farmers to carry out Mussolini's wish. This farcical campaign was merely a façade to disguise Italy's internal weakness from being known by other more powerful and developed countries such as Germany and Britain, which profoundly intimidated Mussolini.

See also

Battle of the Lira
Battle for Births
Economy of Fascist Italy

References

Sources
 Celli, Carlo. 2013. Economic Fascism: Primary Sources on Mussolini's Crony Capitalism. Axios Press. 
Fascist Italy by John Hite
Mussolini by Denis Mack Smith

External links
History Learning Site

Economic history of Italy
Italian Fascism
Food politics
History of agriculture
Grain trade